The Big Two derby, also referred to simply as the Big Two or Bel Classico, is the name given to the Northern Irish association football derby between Belfast clubs, Linfield and Glentoran. The derby is also sometimes referred to as the Belfast derby. They are the two most successful and most supported clubs in Northern Irish Football. They traditionally face each other on Boxing Day each year which usually attracts the largest Irish Premiership attendance of the season. They regularly play each other in the league, and have contested more cup finals together than any other two clubs. They also make up two of the three clubs (along with Cliftonville) that have competed in every season of the Irish League's top flight since its inception in 1890 – neither club ever suffering relegation.

Although Linfield and Glentoran have been the two most successful clubs in the domestic game to date, Linfield has won all three of the current major domestic trophies more than any other club. They have won more than twice as many league titles as their rivals, with Linfield having won 56 league titles to Glentoran's 23. Linfield has also lifted the Irish Cup a record 43 times to Glentoran's 23, and has won the League Cup a record 10 times to Glentoran's seven.

History
The term "Big Two" did not always refer to Linfield and Glentoran. Up until 1949, the big two were considered to be Linfield and Belfast Celtic as they had traditionally been the most successful teams in Northern Irish football. Given the traditional political following of both clubs (Linfield, like Glentoran, with a mainly unionist following, and Belfast Celtic with a mainly nationalist following), sectarian violence between supporters of both clubs was common. This culminated with a riot on 26 December 1948 at Windsor Park that saw three Celtic players injured by Linfield supporters, including striker Jimmy Jones who sustained a broken leg. Belfast Celtic left the Irish League at the end of the season and Glentoran became Linfield's biggest rivals.

Both teams are predominantly Protestant; however, Glentoran has fielded Catholic players and had Catholic fans for much of its history. Linfield fielded relatively few Catholic players prior to the 1980s, which led to an accusation that the club held a policy of not signing Catholic players – similar to Scottish team, Rangers. However, the existence of such a policy has been disputed by some, including well-known local journalist Malcolm Brodie. Support is traditionally split geographically with Linfield based in the south of the city and Glentoran in the east. Although both based in Belfast, they are separated by the River Lagan and are in two different counties. Linfield is based in County Antrim and Glentoran is based in County Down, although Glentoran and other County Down-based sides compete in the County Antrim Shield.

The first game of which there is any record between Linfield and Glentoran took place on 1 October 1887. A friendly match played at King's Field, Westbourne in Ballymacarrett was won 3–1 by Linfield (then known as Linfield Athletic), with goalscorers Torrans (2) and Vance, and Glentoran's goalscorer unknown. The two teams played each other competitively for the first time in the inaugural Irish League season, with Linfield winning 7–0 at Musgrave Park on 18 October 1890, and 6–0 at Ulsterville Avenue on 21 March 1891. The first game at The Oval took place on 8 October 1892, and the first game at Windsor Park on 2 September 1905. Linfield previously played at a ground in Ulsterville Avenue, Belfast, before moving to Windsor Park, which is situated within walking distance of their old ground. Also the home of the Northern Ireland national football team, they have played at Windsor Park ever since.

In 1941, during World War II, The Oval – including terraces, offices, kits and club records – was destroyed in a bombing raid on the nearby Harland & Wolff Shipyard. Glentoran approached Distillery to play at Grosvenor Park, which they did until The Oval was rebuilt in 1949, with help from other Irish League clubs, most notably Distillery and Cliftonville. Glentoran considered leaving senior football to become a junior club, but after being lent kits from Distillery and Crusaders they continued to compete at Grosvenor. Out of 14 league games at Grosvenor Park however, they were only victorious over Linfield on one occasion.

Since Belfast Celtic folded in 1949, the intensity of the Big Two rivalry has increased due to the fact that Glentoran has been the only club that has generated a support base similar in size to Linfield's, and because a number of Belfast Celtic fans started to support Glentoran due to the dissolution of their club. In the 1985 Irish Cup final at the Oval, Glentoran supporters released a cockerel (Glentoran's club emblem), and a pig that had been painted blue onto the pitch to insult fans of Linfield. In 2005, Linfield fans broke through a gate in perimeter fencing onto the pitch of The Oval and threw missiles at Glentoran fans in the main stand. The BBC and Ulster Television were ordered to give police footage they had filmed of the game after 9 fans were charged with the violence. 9 police officers and 2 Glentoran fans were injured in the violence.

Both sides share rivalries with North Belfast clubs Cliftonville and Crusaders. The two however are less successful than the Big Two and see each other as their main rivals, contesting the North Belfast derby. They also both traditionally shared a rivalry with Lisburn Distillery, but since Distillery's relocation from Grosvenor Park to Lisburn, and their downturn in on-pitch fortunes, the rivalry has ebbed.

Trophy dominance
Linfield and Glentoran have been the two most successful clubs in Northern Irish football to date, regularly being the two main contenders for the major domestic honours. They have won more league titles, Irish Cups, and League Cups than any other clubs. Linfield hold the record for the most League titles (56), Irish Cups (43), and League Cups (10). In comparison, Glentoran have won 23 league titles, 23 Irish Cups, and 7 League Cups. Almost half (47.1%) of the 140 Irish Cup competitions to date have been won by one of the two clubs, with at least one of the clubs reaching the final on 91 occasions (65% of all finals), winning the cup a combined 66 times. Of those 91 finals, the two clubs have met in 15 of them – making it the most common final. Linfield have won eight of the head-to-head final meetings compared to Glentoran's seven wins, with the most recent final meeting between the two clubs occurring in the 2006 final, when Linfield won 2–1 to lift the Cup for the 37th time. Almost two-thirds (64.7%) of all Irish League titles have been won by one of the Big Two. Of the 119 completed league seasons, the title has been won by either club on 77 occasions. The duo also make up two of the three clubs that have appeared in every season of the Irish League since its inception in 1890; the other club being Cliftonville.

Linfield's financial advantage over the other clubs must be acknowledged when comparing their relative success. In 1912, seven of the eight league clubs resigned from the IFA due to Linfield receiving higher fees than other clubs for hosting international games. This schism, while quickly mended, led to the striking of the Gold Cup as an alternative Irish Cup from which the seven clubs were excluded. In 1984, the IFA signed a 104-year agreement with Linfield to host internationals at Windsor Park, with only Glentoran objecting to the deal at the time. The contract meant that Linfield were entitled to a payment of 15% of all revenues generated from home internationals. This became financially lucrative for Linfield after the IFA signed a £10 million deal with Sky to televise internationals. Linfield maintained ownership of the stadium, and were required to maintain the stadium to international standard, however, over the years, the stadium had fallen into disrepair. This necessitated redevelopment, with the Northern Ireland government funding the majority of the £36 million project to rebuild the stadium. The IFA then took over ownership of the stadium, while Linfield retained ownership of the land. In 2012, Linfield and the IFA agreed a new contract for the use of Windsor Park. Linfield would receive an annual payment as rent for the land, but would no longer receive 15% of the ticket sales, TV rights, and commercial rights from international matches as they did under the old agreement. The 51-year agreement took effect from May 2014, with Linfield initially receiving £200,000 per year - subject to review (being adjusted for inflation etc.) every four years. This rose by 7% to £214,000 in 2018, and is due to increase again in 2022. The contract will expire in 2065.

Statistics

Head-to-head record

Overall
Statistics for which reliable sources have been found apply to competitive games in all competitions (wartime league results not included). Wins include those after extra time and/or penalty shoot-outs.

League only
Statistics apply to league matches only (wartime results not included)

Results

League results
All time results taken from Irish Football Club Project, British Newspaper Archive and various other sources. Attendance figures from nifootballleague.com.

 1 In 1895-96, Linfield played all their matches away from home after their Ulsterville ground was purchased for development.
 2 This match was played to determine the league winner after both teams finished level on points in the table.

Other results

 1 Match ended early after Glentoran players refused to continue claiming a Linfield player punched a shot clear from the goal-line and no penalty had been awarded
 2 Linfield competed as the "New Blues" due to the club not having registered with the newly-formed "New Irish Football Association"
 3 Linfield were leading 1-0 when the match was abandoned due to a snowstorm. A replay was ordered but Linfield refused to play and Glentoran were awarded victory
 4 Linfield were awarded victory as Glentoran refused to play at Solitude

References

1887 establishments in Ireland
History of Belfast
Sport in Belfast
Association football in Northern Ireland
Northern Ireland football derbies